Walter Feist (1907–1977) was a German luger who competed from the late 1920s to the late 1950s. He won seven medals in the men's doubles event at the European championships with five golds (1929, 1934, 1935, 1938, 1939) and two silvers (1928, 1937).

References

German male lugers
1907 births
1977 deaths